William Fenn may refer to:
 William Fenn (cyclist) (1904–1980), American cyclist
 William Fenn (cricketer) (1828–1886), English cricketer and clergyman
 William Wallace Fenn (1862–1932), Unitarian minister and dean of Harvard Divinity School